Urtis Orlando Blackett (born 24 March 1973) is a Saint Vincentian retired international footballer who played as a goalkeeper.

Career
Blackett earned one cap for the Saint Vincent and the Grenadines national team, coming in a 2000 friendly against Costa Rica. He had been in the squad for the 1996 CONCACAF Gold Cup, but did not make an appearance as Fitzgerald Bramble started both matches at the tournament for Saint Vincent.

Retirement
After retiring as a player, Blackett stayed involved in football as a coach. He served as an assistant coach for the Saint Vincent and the Grenadines women's national team at the 2016 Windward Islands Tournament and for the men's under-20 national team at the 2018 CONCACAF U-20 Championship.

Outside of football, Blackett lived in East Kingstown and was employed as a sales worker. In August 2020, he won $5,800 through the lottery in Saint Vincent and the Grenadines.

References

1973 births
Living people
Saint Vincent and the Grenadines footballers
Association football goalkeepers
Saint Vincent and the Grenadines international footballers
1996 CONCACAF Gold Cup players